The Bulgaria women's national under-18 basketball team is a national basketball team of Bulgaria, administered by the Bulgarian Basketball Federation. It represents the country in women's international under-18 basketball competitions.

FIBA U18 Women's European Championship participations

FIBA Under-19 Women's Basketball World Cup participations

See also
Bulgaria women's national basketball team
Bulgaria women's national under-16 basketball team
Bulgaria men's national under-19 basketball team

References

External links
Archived records of Bulgaria team participations

Basketball in Bulgaria
Basketball
Women's national under-18 basketball teams